Ksar or qsar (Maghrebi Arabic: قصر qṣer or ڭصر gser, plural qṣur; Berber:  ⵉⴴⵔⵎ aghrem or ighrem, plural: igherman), plural ksars, qsars, ksour or qsour, is the North African term for "fortified village," from Arabic qaṣar, itself possibly loaned from Latin castrum. The term generally refers to a Berber fortified village.

Related terms 
The origin of the Maghrebi Arabic term qsar is qaṣar in Standard Arabic, which means "castle" or "palace"; this term is also found elsewhere in the Muslim world. See, for example, the Iberian alcázar. 

The Berber (Amazigh) original word for "ksar" used in North Africa by the Berber-speaking populations is aghrem (singular) or igherman (plural). In the Maghreb, the term has a more general meaning of  "fortified village," or "fort". The Berber word igherman might be a cognate word, with an identical meaning, with the word Garamantes, which is the name of the ancient Berber city-states in modern-day Libya.

Architecture 

Ksour in the Maghreb typically consist of attached houses, often having collective ghorfa (granaries) and other structures like a mosque, bath, oven, and shops. Ksour / igherman are widespread among the oasis populations of North Africa. Ksars are sometimes situated in mountain locations to make defense easier; they often are entirely within a single, continuous wall. The building material of the entire structure is normally adobe, or cut stone and adobe. The idea of the ksar as a granary is a confused notion of two things, the granary itself, found within a ksar, and the ksar, which is a village, normally with granaries within it. Ksars form one of the main manifestations of Berber architecture.

Places named Ksar

The word is part of place names across Morocco, Algeria, and Tunisia, — the region called the Maghreb; and is particularly prevalent on the Saharan side of the various ranges of the Atlas Mountains and the valley of the Draa River.

 Ksar Hadada, Tunisia, Star Wars: Episode I – The Phantom Menace was filmed there. 
 Ksar Halloof, Tunisia.
 Ksar Oulad Dabab, Tunisia.
 Ksar es-Seghir, Moroccan stronghold in the Straits of Gibraltar, between Tangier and Ceuta
 Ksar el-Kebir, location of the Battle of Alcácer Quibir, influenced Moroccan, Portuguese and Spanish history
 Ksar Nalut, Libya
 Ksar Ouled Soltane, Tunisia

See also
 List of ksour in Tunisia
 Ghorfa
 Alcázar (also Alcácer or Alcasser)
 Ribat
 Maghreb placename etymology

References

External links

 www.ksour-tunisiens.com – complete documentation of all ksour of southern Tunisia, Herbert Popp & Abdelfettah Kassah

 
Arabic words and phrases
Arabic fortifications
Berber architecture
Fortifications by type
Sahara
Castles
Ribats